Alamüdün (also Alamedin and Alamudun) is a town and northern suburb of Bishkek in Chüy Region of Kyrgyzstan, part of Alamüdün District (raion). Its population was 12,198 in 2021. It lies along the M39 highway which leads to Korday on the Kazakh border and further to Almaty. Alamüdün contains an elm grove park to the west with Lake Komsomolskoye. Its main market is the Alamüdün Bazaar and its football club, FC Alamudun, plays in the top division in Kyrgyzstan, the Kyrgyzstan League. It is the birthplace of Tatyana Kolpakova.

Population

References

Populated places in Chüy Region
Bishkek
Kazakhstan–Kyrgyzstan border crossings